Personality Kid is a 1946 American adventure drama film directed by George Sherman and starring Anita Louise, Michael Duane and Ted Donaldson. It was produced and distributed by Columbia Pictures. The film's sets were designed by the art director Cary Odell.

Synopsis

Cast
 Anita Louise as 	Laura Howard
 Michael Duane as 	Harry Roberts
 Ted Donaldson as Davey Roberts
 Barbara Brown as 	Mrs. Roberts
 Bobby Larson as 	Albert Partridge
 Oscar O'Shea as 	Officer O'Brien
 Harlan Briggs as 	Mr. Howard
 Regina Wallace as 	Mrs. Partridge
 Edythe Elliott as 	Mrs. Howard
 Martin Garralaga as 	Melendez 
 Paul Maxey as	Mr. Partridge

References

External links

Personality Kid at TCMDB

1946 films
1940s English-language films
Films directed by George Sherman
American romantic drama films
1946 romantic drama films
American black-and-white films
1940s American films
Columbia Pictures films